Russell Dean Dupuis (born 9 July 1947) is an American physicist.

He holds the Steve W. Chaddick Endowed Chair in Electro-Optics in the School of Electrical and Computer Engineering at Georgia Tech. He has made pioneering contributions to metalorganic chemical vapor deposition (MOCVD) and continuous-wave room-temperature quantum-well lasers. His other work has focused on III-V heterojunction devices, and LEDs.

Dupuis was elected as a member into the National Academy of Engineering in 1989 for pioneering work in metalorganic chemical vapor deposition and demonstration of heterostructure devices.

Education
Dupuis earned his B.S. (1970), his M.S. (1971), and his Ph.D. (1972) in Electrical Engineering from the University of Illinois at Urbana-Champaign.

Career History

Prof. Dupuis initially worked at Texas Instruments from 1973 to 1975. 
He joined Rockwell International in 1975, where he was the forerunner to demonstrate that MOCVD could be used for the growth of high-quality semiconductor thin films and devices. 
Next, in 1979 he moved to AT&T Bell Laboratories where he extended his work to the growth of InP-InGaAsP by MOCVD. 
He moved to academia in 1989 to become a chaired professor at the University of Texas at Austin.

Awards and memberships
A Georgia Research Alliance Eminent Scholar, Dupuis and two of his colleagues were awarded the 2002 National Medal of Technology by President George W. Bush for their work on developing and commercializing LEDs. He won the 1985 IEEE Morris N. Liebmann Memorial Award.  In 2015, Dupuis and four others shared the Charles Stark Draper Prize in Engineering given by the U.S. National Academy of Engineering. He is a member of the National Academy of Engineering and is a Fellow of the IEEE, the American Physical Society, the American Association for the Advancement of Science, and the Optical Society of America.

Russell D. Dupuis won the 2004 John Bardeen Award and the 2007 IEEE Edison Medal.

References

External links
Official profile

1947 births
Living people
American electrical engineers
Fellow Members of the IEEE
Members of the United States National Academy of Engineering
National Medal of Technology recipients
Draper Prize winners
IEEE Edison Medal recipients
Georgia Tech faculty
Grainger College of Engineering alumni
Fellows of the American Physical Society
Fellows of Optica (society)